Cadle (also Cadle Station) is a ghost town in Bibb County, Alabama, United States.

Notes

Geography of Bibb County, Alabama
Ghost towns in Alabama